Arnold David Lanni (born May 4, 1956) is a Canadian record producer and former member of  Frōzen Ghōst and Sheriff. He wrote Sheriff's most successful song, "When I'm with You."

History
Lanni was a founding member of Canadian rock band Sheriff in 1979.  The band only released one album (their 1982 self-titled effort, which included "When I'm with You" and another minor hit, "You Remind Me") before breaking up in 1985. Sheriff members Lanni and Wolf Hassel then formed Frozen Ghost, which existed 1985 to 1993. Lanni was a guitarist, keyboardist and vocalist for this project.

In 2000 Lanni was nominated as producer of the year at the Juno Awards.

Lanni has produced Canadian rock groups Finger Eleven, Simple Plan, the first four Our Lady Peace albums (including the diamond-certified Clumsy), Hello Operator, Thousand Foot Krutch, Echo Jet, The Waking Eyes and Rev. He has also produced American groups The Gufs and King's X (Ear Candy).

References

External links
This Week in Musical History website -Lanni's birth details

1956 births
Living people
Place of birth missing (living people)
Canadian rock singers
Canadian male singers
Canadian rock guitarists
Canadian male guitarists
Canadian record producers
Canadian rock pianists
Canadian rock keyboardists
Musicians from Toronto
Sheriff (band) members
Canadian male pianists
21st-century Canadian pianists
21st-century Canadian male musicians